Nedelcho Nedev (born 18 September 1948) is a Bulgarian wrestler. He competed in the men's Greco-Roman 68 kg at the 1976 Summer Olympics.

References

1948 births
Living people
Bulgarian male sport wrestlers
Olympic wrestlers of Bulgaria
Wrestlers at the 1976 Summer Olympics
People from Varna Province